Alexander Anderson (1676–1737) was a Church of Scotland minister who served as Moderator of the General Assembly in 1735.

Life

He was born in St Andrews around 1676 the son of John Anderson, Principal of St Leonards College in St Andrews. He studied at the same college graduating Ma in July 1697. He was licensed to preach as a Church of Scotland minister by the Presbytery of St Andrews in February 1700.

In September 1700 he was ordained as minister of Kemback Parish Church. He translated to Falkland Parish Church in May 1702. In April 1725 he translated to St Andrews Parish Church.

In 1735 he succeeded Rev James Gordon as Moderator of the General Assembly of the Church of Scotland the highest position in the Scottish church.

He died on 9 November 1737 aged 61.

Family

He married Isabella Hay (d.1720) daughter of Francis Hay of Strowie. Thir children included:

James Anderson of Newbigging (1719–1794) advocate
Margaret Anderson, married Rev Laurence Watson, second charge minister of St Leonard's Church under Anderson and later married Rev Lauchlan McIntosh of Errol

Publications
Not known

References
 

1676 births
1737 deaths
People from St Andrews
Alumni of the University of St Andrews
Moderators of the General Assembly of the Church of Scotland